Philippines competed in the 2012 Asian Beach Games, held in Haiyang, People's Republic of China from June 16 to June 22, 2012. The Philippine contingent finally went home with a medal, an improvement from 2010 Asian Beach Games.

Medalists

Silver

Bronze

Multiple

Medal summary

By sports

References

External links

Nations at the 2012 Asian Beach Games
2012
Asian Beach Games